"New York City" is a song by American DJ duo The Chainsmokers from the duo's first EP Bouquet. It features uncredited vocals from American singer Victoria Zaro. The song peaked at number 25 on the US Dance/Electronic Songs chart and number 80 on the 2016 Dance/Electronic Songs year-end chart. The chorus is interpolated in Fivio Foreign's single City of Gods.

Charts

Weekly charts

Year-end charts

Certifications

Release history

References

2015 songs
The Chainsmokers songs
Songs written by Andrew Taggart
Disruptor Records singles
Songs about New York City